Al-Suqoor Club is a Libyan football club based in Tobruk, Libya.

Honors
Libyan Cup
Winner : 1989

Performance in CAF competitions
CAF Cup Winners' Cup
First Round : 1990
(Al Suqoor were the first club from outside either Tripoli or Benghazi to represent Libya in continental competition)

Current players

External links
Team profile – Soccerway
Facebook page web

Soukour
Association football clubs established in 1922
Tobruk
1922 establishments in Libya